The 2002 Pacific-10 Conference men's basketball tournament was played March 7–9 at Staples Center in Los Angeles, California.  The event was revived after eleven seasons without, and USC made its first appearance in the final. The champion of the tournament was Arizona, which received the Pac-10's automatic bid to the NCAA tournament.  The Most Outstanding Player was Luke Walton of Arizona, and a capacity crowd of 18,997 attended the championship game on

Seeds
The top eight teams participated, with all in the Thursday   Teams were seeded by conference record, with a tiebreaker system used to seed teams with identical conference records. The previous four editions  included all ten teams, with the final on Sunday.

Bracket

Tournament Notes
 Arch-rivals Arizona and ASU met for the first time in a Pac-10 Tournament (the 2nd meeting ever by any arch-rival universities).
 Only one lower seeded team beat a higher seeded team the whole tournament (#4 USC over #1 Oregon in the second round).
 In this tournament Oregon set the team single game record for the most blocked shots with 9 (vs. Washington).
 This was the first Pac-10 Basketball Tournament held in the 21st Century.

All tournament team
 Luke Walton, Arizona – Tournament MVP
 Sam Clancy, USC
 Brandon Granville, USC
 Jason Gardner, Arizona
 Salim Stoudamire, Arizona

References

2001–02 Pacific-10 Conference men's basketball season
Pac-12 Conference men's basketball tournament